Jos van Manen Pieters (Zaandam, 21 March 1930 – Ede, 1 February 2015) was a Dutch writer. She won the Athos Award in 1965.

Life
She wrote about thirty books, in which she did not shy away from sensitive subjects such as incest. Her successful novel series “Tuinfluitertrilogie” appeared from 1955 and it has been reprinted several times.

Books
En de tuinfluiter zingt
Roepend in de wind
Gods geheimschrift
Tocht zonder thuisreis
Een nest vol tuinfluiters
Rosemarie
Er gebeurt geen wonder
Als de tuinfluiter zwijgt
Dat lieve, gevaarlijke leven
Dit is mijn haven
Vergeet het maar
Tot overmaat van geluk
Liefde incognito
Geef mij een teken van leven
Dromen sterven niet
Alleen van horen zeggen
Soms krijgt geluk een nieuw gezicht
Een pad door de wildernis
Voetsporen op het water
De troostvogel
Elke woestijn heeft zijn bron
Langs groene oevers van hoop
Een mens die aan jouw kant staat
Een scheepje van papier
De verrekijker
Als een blad in de storm
Ten leven opgeschreven
Vluchtstrook
Scharnier in de tijd
Ogen van de overzij

References

1930 births
2015 deaths
20th-century Dutch writers
21st-century Dutch writers
Dutch women writers
20th-century Dutch women